Númenor, also called Elenna-nórë or Westernesse, is a fictional place in J. R. R. Tolkien's writings. It was the kingdom occupying a large island to the west of Middle-earth, the main setting of Tolkien's writings, and was the greatest civilization of Men. However, after centuries of prosperity many of the inhabitants ceased to worship the One God, Eru Ilúvatar, and rebelled against the Valar, resulting in the destruction of the island and the death of most of its people. Tolkien intended Númenor to allude to the legendary Atlantis. Commentators have noted that the destruction of Númenor echoes the Biblical stories of the fall of man and the destruction of Sodom and Gomorrah, and John Milton's Paradise Lost.

Fictional geography

Physical geography 

A Description of the Island of Númenor, published in Unfinished Tales, was supposedly derived from the archives of Gondor. The island of Númenor was in the Great Sea, closer to Aman in the West than to the continent of Middle-earth in the east. In shape it was a five-pointed star, with five peninsulas extending from the central region. The island itself was "tilted southward and a little eastward". The largest river was the Siril. Karen Wynn Fonstad estimated the island to be 167,691 square miles [435,017 km²] in area.

Númenor was divided into six main regions: the five promontories and the central area.

Mittalmar or "the Inlands" was the central region, high and land-locked except for a small coast around Rómenna, with the mountain of Meneltarma at its centre. Much of the region consisted of grasslands, pastures and low downs with few trees. Númenor's main rivers, Siril and Nunduinë, arose in Mittalmar, on or near Meneltarma. Mittalmar's eastern district, Arandor, was the most populated part of Númenor, with Armenelos, the capital, and Rómenna. In the south-west of Mittalmar lay the district of Emerië, Númenor's prime sheep-grazing area.

Andustar or "the Westlands" was a fertile wooded region, rocky to the north, with high coastal cliffs to the west. Its bays held several harbours. The northern highlands were covered by fir-woods, while in the south the forests consisted mainly of birches and beeches upon the upper ground and of oaks and elms in vales.

Hyarnustar or "the Southwestlands" had vineyards and fertile farmlands in the east, with wide beaches on that coast, and highlands and coastal cliffs to the west.

Hyarrostar or "the Southeastlands" was the lowest-lying region, with long gentle shores, especially in the west, and plantations to supply timber for shipbuilding.

Orrostar or "the Eastlands" was a cool but fertile region, with highlands in the north. In the south-west were vast plantations of grain.

Forostar or "the Northlands" was rocky and the least fertile region, with heather moors rising in the north to rocky hills, and few trees. Its quarries provided the best building stone. The fifth king Tar-Meneldur built his tall tower here to watch the stars.

The most populous towns were coastal, mostly connected by dirt roads. A paved highway ran across the island of Númenor from east to west, connecting Rómenna, Armenelos, the Valley of Tombs, Ondosto and Andúnië.

Armenelos, "Royal citadel", was the capital and in later years the largest city of Númenor. It lay inland, near the centre of Arandor, about 20 miles from mount Meneltarma. The closest coast was some 50 miles to the east at Rómenna. It contained the royal palace, the King's House. A tall tower was constructed there by the first King Elros, son of the seafaring hero Earendil, and the White Tree Nimloth, living symbol of the Kingdom of Númenor, was planted in the days of the sixth King, the explorer Tar-Aldarion. During the reign of the 25th and last King, the proud Ar-Pharazôn, a giant circular temple to Morgoth was built in the city, over five hundred feet in diameter and as much in height to its cornice line, above which a silver dome rose. The dome had an oculus, from which the smoke of numerous burned sacrifices rose, tarnishing the silver soon after its completion.

Andúnië, "Sunset", was a port on the west side of Númenor, which looked towards the Undying Lands; the Eldar used to land there. Valandil was the first Lord of Andúnië, and his successors were important in shaping Númenórean policies. As the Shadow fell over Númenor, Armenelos overtook Andúnië.

Rómenna, "Eastwards" (for ships sailing to Middle-earth), was a harbour at the head of the long firth on the east of Númenor. It became important as shipbuilding and seafaring grew, especially from the reign of Tar-Aldarion.

Eldalondë or "Elf-haven" was a seaport on the western coast where the Elves would arrive from Tol Eressëa, and the river Nunduinë emptied into the Bay of Eldanna. It was "the most beautiful of all the havens of Númenor", compared by the Elves to a town in Eressëa.

Culture 

The Númenóreans were descended from the Edain of Beleriand, with three clans: the people of Hador, the people of Bëor, and the Folk of Haleth. Most Númenóreans descended from the fair-haired and blue-eyed people of Hador. The settlers of the western regions, especially Andustar, came mostly from the people of Bëor, with darker hair and grey eyes. A few remnants of the Folk of Haleth and a few families of the Drúedain were also present. The average Númenórean was taller than two rangar, or 6'4". Elendil was the tallest of Men who escaped the Downfall (almost 2.5 rangar tall, 7'11"). Tolkien originally suggested that Númenóreans not of the Line of Elros lived for 200 years, with royal kindred living 400 years. Later, royal Númenóreans were said to have "five times" the lifespan of normal men, or 300–350 years. Men of the House of Elros lived for some 400 years; this diminished due to their rebellion. Coming-of-age was at 25 years.

The common language of the Númenóreans, Adûnaic, was derived from Taliska, the speech of the Hadorians. The descendants of the people of Bëor were sometimes said to have spoken an accented form of Adûnaic, while elsewhere it is stated that they had dropped their own tongue before coming to the island and used the Grey-elven Sindarin as daily speech in Númenor. All texts, however, agree that Sindarin was known to most Númenóreans and was widely used in noble families; the latter also knew the High-elven Quenya, employing it in works of lore and nomenclature. This changed when the friendship with the Elves was broken; usage of both Sindarin and Quenya lessened, until at last King Ar-Adûnakhôr forbade their teaching, and knowledge of the Elven-tongues was only preserved by the Faithful.

Before the coming of the Shadow, the Númenóreans maintained several traditions connected with the worship of Ilúvatar and respect to the Valar. Among them are recorded the setting a bough of the fragrant oiolairë upon the prow of a departing ship, the ceremonies concerned with the passing of the Sceptre, and laying down one's life. The most famous traditions were the Three Prayers, during which a great concourse of people ascended to the holy summit of Meneltarma and the King praised Eru Ilúvatar. These were the spring prayer for a good year, Erukyermë; the midsummer prayer for a good harvest, Erulaitalë; and the autumn harvest thanksgiving, Eruhantalë.

The Númenórean calendar, the "King's Reckoning", is similar to the Gregorian, with a week of seven days, a year of 365 days except in leap years, and twelve months (astar): ten with 30 days and two with 31. However, King's Reckoning has some days outside the months, a feature borrowed from Elvish Calendars, which were generally holidays. Two of these were the pair which book-ends the year; thus the last month of the year was followed by mettarë, the last day of the year; this was followed by yestarë, New Year's Day, before the start of the first month. The other monthless day was loëndë, mid-year day. In a leap year there were two mid-year days. In the Second and Third Ages, years were reckoned from the beginning of the age. Various irregularities occur in this calendar, especially following the Downfall. Mardil Voronwë revised the calendar, and the new version became the "Steward's Reckoning": all the months had 30 days, with two additional "extra" days at the equinoxes, tuilérë and yáviérë. The five extra days (the equinoxes, midsummer and two at midwinter) were holidays.
The Reunited Kingdom adopted a "New Reckoning", which began the year on March 25 (cf. Lady Day, the English new year between A.D. 1155 and 1752), the date of the downfall of Sauron. This made it correspond more closely to the spring beginning of the Elven calendar.
The months of the Reckonings were in Quenya (or Sindarin among the Dúnedain):

This is similar in structure to the French Republican calendar. For example, the names of the third month of Winter, Súlímë, Gwaeron, and Ventôse, all mean 'Windy', and so on for the other months.

Fictional history

Land of gift 

The island of Númenor was raised from the sea as a gift from the Valar to the Edain, the Fathers of Men who had stood with the Elves of Beleriand against Morgoth in the wars of the First Age. Númenor was offered as a reward, a "rest after the war" for the Edain. Early in the Second Age the greater part of those Edain who had survived the wars left Middle-earth and journeyed to the isle, sailing in ships provided and steered by the Elves. The migration took 50 years and brought 5,000 to 10,000 people to the island.
The realm was established early in the Second Age, when Elros Half-elven, son of Eärendil, gave up his Elven immortality to become a Man and the first King of Númenor. Under his rule, and those of his descendants, the Númenóreans rose to become a powerful people, friendly with Elves, both of Eressëa and of Middle-earth. The Elves of Eressëa brought gifts including skills and plants. Elros brought a measure of Elvish blood and magical power to the kingdom. Among these gifts were seven palantíri, magical orbs that could foresee the future, for the Lords of Andúnië.

Sea-kings 

Númenor was surrounded by the Great Sea of Arda, and the sea had a profound influence on Númenor's culture and history. From the earliest times in its history, fish from the sea were a significant part of Númenórean diet; those providing this food were Númenor's first sea-farers. The Númenóreans swiftly became skilled shipbuilders and mariners, with a desire to explore and master the ocean. There was one limitation on this activity: the Ban of the Valar. When the island of Númenor had been gifted to the Edain, they were strictly prohibited from sailing west out of sight of the island. This was because the Undying Lands, forbidden to mortals, lay tantalizingly close to the west of Númenor.
So the Númenóreans began exploring the seas to the north, east, and south. They reached Middle-earth to the east, and explored its coasts including the Eastern Sea on the far side of Middle-earth. The Númenóreans brought the gifts of their superior civilization to the Men of Middle-earth, who called the Númenóreans the Sea-kings. News of Númenórean seafarers spread far inland in Middle-earth; even the reclusive Ents heard of the coming of "the Great Ships".
Númenóreans had established good relations with Gil-galad, the king of the High Elves of the northwest of Middle-earth, whose ships sailed from the Grey Havens.
Aldarion founded the Uinendili, a guild of sea-farers, in honour of Uinen, goddess of the Sea. He succeeded to the throne and became known as the Mariner-king. He established Vinyalondë (later called Lond Daer), the first Númenórean settlement in Middle-earth. This port provided access to the great forests of Eriador, which the Númenóreans needed for ship-building.
The Númenóreans assisted Gil-galad in Middle-earth's War of the Elves and Sauron, which broke out after the forging of the Rings of Power, in particular the One Ring. Tar-Minastir, later the eleventh King of Númenor, assembled an armada, and sent it to Gil-galad's aid. The forces of Númenor were without peer in war, and together with the Elves, they were able to temporarily defeat Sauron.

The Shadow looms 

The increasing power of the Númenóreans had a dark side; the exploitation of Middle-earth's forests had devastated large regions of Eriador. The Númenóreans established further settlements in Middle-earth, coming to rule a coastal empire with no rival. At first, they had engaged with the Men of Middle-earth in a friendly manner, but Minastir's successors, Tar-Ciryatan and Tar-Atanamir "the Great", became increasingly tyrannical, oppressing the Men of Middle-earth and exacting heavy tribute.
The Númenóreans made Umbar, the harbour city in the south of Middle-earth, into a great fortress and greatly expanded Pelargir, a landing in Gondor near the Mouths of the Anduin. 
Increasing numbers of Númenóreans became jealous of Elves for their immortality, resenting the Ban of the Valar, and sought everlasting life. Those of this persuasion were the faction of "King's Men". 
Those who remained loyal to the Valar and friendly to the Elves (and using Elvish languages) were the "Faithful", also called the "Elf-friends" or Elendili; they were led by the Lords of Andúnië. In the reign of Tar-Ancalimon (S.A. 2221-2386), the King's Men became dominant, and the Faithful became a persecuted minority accused of being "spies of the Valar".

Sauron 

Late in the Second Age, Ar-Pharazôn, the 25th monarch of Númenor, sailed to Middle-earth to challenge Sauron, known to the Númenóreans as Zigûr, who had claimed to be the King of Men and overlord of Middle-earth. Ar-Pharazôn landed at Umbar to do battle, but seeing the might of Númenor, Sauron's armies fled, and Sauron surrendered without a fight. He was brought back to Númenor as a prisoner, but he soon seduced the king and many other Númenóreans, promising them eternal life if they worshipped his master Melkor. In this temple human sacrifices were offered to Melkor. During this time, the White Tree Nimloth, which stood before the King's House in Armenelos and whose fate was  tied to the line of kings, was cut down and burned as a sacrifice to Melkor, at Sauron's direction. Isildur rescued a fruit of the tree which became an ancestor of the White Tree of Gondor.

Cataclysm 

Prompted by Sauron and fearing old age and death, Ar-Pharazôn built a great armada and sailed into the West to make war upon the Valar, intending to seize the Undying Lands and achieve immortality. Sauron remained behind. Ar-Pharazôn landed on the shores of Aman. As the Valar were forbidden to take direct action against Men, Manwë, chief of the Valar, called upon Eru Ilúvatar, the One God.
In response, Eru caused the Changing of the World: the hitherto flat Earth was transformed into a globe, Númenor sank beneath the ocean, and the Undying Lands were removed from the Earth forever. The whole population on the island was drowned. Most of Ar-Pharazôn's armada, too, met their doom in the cataclysm. This was the second fall of Men, the first being when Men first awoke and fell swiftly under the dominion of Melkor. 

Sauron himself was caught in the cataclysm he had helped bring about. His body was destroyed, and he could never again assume a fair form. He fled back to Middle-earth as a monstrous spirit of hatred that "passed as a shadow and a black wind over the sea", returning to Mordor.

Aftermath 

The Faithful, led by the nobleman Elendil, came to Middle-earth before the cataclysm. Elendil's sons, Isildur and Anárion, founded the two Kingdoms in Exile: Arnor in the north, and Gondor in the south. The two kingdoms attempted to maintain Númenórean culture. Gondor flourished, and "for a while its splendour grew, recalling somewhat of the might of Númenor". Sauron gathered strength in nearby Mordor, setting the scene for a struggle lasting thousands of years. Some of his servants, called the Black Númenóreans since they worshipped the Darkness and were "enamoured of evil knowledge", had left Númenor before its destruction. For over a millennium, their descendants lingered on and remained allied to Sauron in Middle-earth.

Legacy 

The Kings of Arnor and of Gondor were directly descended from Isildur and Anárion, and therefore from the Lords of Andúnië; like their ancestors, they had prolonged lifespans. The kings of Arnor inherited the silver rod of the Lord of Andúnië; it was renamed the Sceptre of Annúminas, and was the chief symbol of Arnor's kingship. The "high men" of Gondor "married late, and their children were few"; eventually the line of kings died out, and Gondor was ruled by Stewards. Aragorn is the head of the Dúnedain ("Men of the West", Númenóreans) surviving in the North at the end of the Third Age and as a descendant of Isildur, has a claim on the kingship.
The Princes of Dol Amroth were descended from a family of The Faithful who had ruled over the land of Belfalas since the Second Age. This family was kin to the Lords of Andúnië, and thus related to Elendil. Sam Gamgee notices Faramir's wizard-like air, to which Faramir replies "Maybe you discern from afar the air of Númenor".

Initially and for many centuries after the downfall of Númenor, the Black Númenóreans retained control of Númenor's colonies and coastal outposts south of the River Anduin and east in Middle-earth. The nearest to Gondor was Umbar, where a Black Númenórean aristocracy survived for a thousand years, exerting strong influence over Harad; two of their number, Herumor and Fuinur, became lords among the Haradwaith. Tolkien writes that their race became mixed with lesser men and as a consequence, "quickly dwindled". Though Gondor fought frequently against Umbar and its allies, King Tarannon Falastur, who ruled during the 9th century of the Third Age, attempted a diplomatic alliance by marrying the Black Númenórean Queen Berúthiel. Theirs was a loveless match: she dabbled in the dark arts and kept ten cats which she used as spies, so Tarannon sent her southward on a ship that was last seen sailing past Umbar. Gondor eventually captured Umbar and held it for about 500 years, while the Black Númenóreans continued to stir up the Southrons against Umbar and Gondor. During the War of the Ring, a nameless Black Númenórean known as the Mouth of Sauron emerged from the Black Gate and spoke to the Captains of the West before the Battle of the Morannon.

As time went on, Gondor became complacent and assumed of their antagonists of old that "some were given over wholly to idleness and ease, and some fought among themselves, until they became conquered in their weakness by the wild men." Gondor lost control of Umbar at the end of the Kin-strife, when rebels from Gondor led by descendants of the usurper Castamir seized the port, and later called themselves the Corsairs of Umbar. A monument at Umbar, which originally commemorated Ar-Pharazôn's defeat of Sauron, stood until an unspecified date late in the Third Age when it was finally torn down.

Influences

Atlantis 

Atlantis ("island of Atlas") is a fictional island mentioned within an allegory on the hubris (excessive pride leading to a downfall) of nations in the ancient Greek philosopher Plato's works Timaeus and Critias.

The destruction of Númenor earned it the Quenya name Atalantë "the Downfallen"; Tolkien described his invention of this additional allusion to Atlantis as a happy accident when he realized that the Quenya root talat- "to fall" could be incorporated into a name for Númenor. Tolkien wrote of Númenor as Atlantis in several of his letters.

The commentator Charles Delattre has noted that the tale of Númenor is a retelling of the myth of Atlantis, the only drowned island in surviving ancient literature, matching several details: it began as a perfect world, geometrically laid out to reflect its balance and harmony; it abounds in valuable minerals; and it has unmatched power, with a strong fleet able to project control far beyond its shores, like ancient Athens. Númenor's pride, too, writes Delattre, matches the hubris of Plato's Atlantis; and its downfall recalls the destruction of Atlantis, the divine Old Testament retribution on Sodom and Gomorrah, and Milton's Paradise Lost.

Lyonesse 

Númenor first appears in The Lord of the Rings, as the vague land of "Westernesse", an advanced civilisation which had existed long ago, far to the west over the Sea, and the ancestral home of the Dúnedain. Tolkien chose the name for its resonance with "Lyonesse", a faraway land that sank into the sea in the Middle English romance King Horn.

Philology 

Tolkien was a professional philologist. For him, the existence of ideas embodied in ancient words and names indicated that there must have been "some original conception", a once-living tradition, behind those ideas. The Tolkien scholar Tom Shippey notes that in Tolkien's The Lost Road, the key names are from Germanic legend, and they speak of elves:

Fall of man 

Tolkien, a devout Roman Catholic, stated that The Downfall of Númenor (Akallabêth) was effectively a second fall of man, with "its central theme .. (inevitably, I think, in a story of Men) a Ban, or Prohibition". Bradley J. Birzer, writing in the J.R.R. Tolkien Encyclopedia, notes that Tolkien thought that every story was essentially about a fall, and accordingly his legendarium contains many "falls": that of Morgoth, of Fëanor and his relatives, and that of Númenor among them. Eric Schweicher, writing in Mythlore, notes that the ban was "soon defied", as in the Biblical fall. The temptation for the Númenoreans was the desire for immortality, and the ban that they broke was not to sail towards the Undying Lands of Aman.

Decline and fall 

The names connected by his philological studies formed for Tolkien the possibility of an inexorable downward progression, from the long-lost mythical world of Númenor in the Second Age, to his fantasy world of Middle-earth in the Third Age, also now lost, to the real ancient Germanic and Anglo-Saxon thousands of years later, and finally down to the modern world, where names like Edwin still survive, all (in the fiction) that is left of Middle-earth, carrying for the knowledgeable philologist a hint of a rich living English mythology. Shippey notes that in Númenor, the myth would have been still stronger, as being an Elf-friend, one of the hated Elendili, marked a person out to the King's Men faction as a target for human sacrifice to Morgoth. Tolkien's "continuous playing with names" led to characters and situations, and sometimes to stories. 

Delattre notes that the position of Númenor in Tolkien's Middle-earth is curious, being "at once marginal and central", not least because in The Lord of the Rings, the glory of Númenor is already ancient history, evoking a sense of loss and nostalgia. This, he writes, is just one of many losses and downfalls in Tolkien's legendarium, leading finally to the last remnants of Númenor in the North, the Dúnedain, and the last Númenorean kingdom, Gondor, which "keeps alive the illusion that Númenor still exists in the South".

Marjorie Burns writes that the feeling of "inevitable disintegration" is borrowed from the Nordic world view which emphasises that all may be lost at any moment. She writes that in Norse mythology, this began during the creation: in the realm of fire, Muspell, the jötunn Surt was even then awaiting the end of the world. Burns comments that in that mythology, even the gods can die, everything has an end, and that, "though [the evil] Sauron may go, the elves will fade as well."

Development 

Originally intended to be a part of a time-travel story in The Notion Club Papers, Tolkien once saw the tale of the fall of Númenor as a conclusion to his The Silmarillion and the "last tale" about the Elder Days. Later, with the emergence of The Lord of the Rings, it became the link back to his mythology of earlier ages.

Adaptations 

C. S. Lewis's 1945 novel That Hideous Strength makes reference to "Numinor and the True West", which Lewis credits as a then-unpublished creation of J. R. R. Tolkien; they were friends and colleagues at Oxford University, and members of The Inklings literary discussion group. The misspelling came from Lewis's only hearing Tolkien say the name in one of his readings.

The television series The Lord of the Rings: The Rings of Power is set mainly in the Second Age. It includes a port city in Númenor, its architecture designed to convey the character of its people. The set is described as "an entire seaside city" with buildings, alleyways, shrines, graffiti, and a ship docked at the harbour. The production designer Ramsey Avery based Númenor's "looming marble structures" on Ancient Greece and Venice, while he used the colour blue to reflect the culture's emphasis on water and sailing.

Notes

References

Primary 
This list identifies each item's location in Tolkien's writings.

Secondary

Sources 

  
    
       
 
     
 
 
 
 
 
 
 
 
 

 
Middle-earth realms
Middle-earth islands
Atlantis in fiction

de:Regionen und Orte in Tolkiens Welt#Númenor
la:Geographia Legendarii Tolkien#Numenor